Potamogeton foliosus is a species of aquatic plant known by the common name leafy pondweed. It is native to nearly all of North America and parts of Central America, where it grows in water bodies such as ponds, lakes, ditches, and slow-moving streams. It has been reported from every state in the United States except Hawaii as well as from every Canadian province and territory except Newfoundland and Nunavut.

Potamogeton foliosus is a perennial herb growing from a dense, mat-forming rhizome that anchors in wet substrate. It produces a thin, compressed, multibranched stem growing to a maximum length around 75 centimeters. The delicate, hairlike leaves are up to 10 centimeters long. They are pale green to olive green or reddish in color. The inflorescence is a small cluster or spike of flowers arising from the water on a short peduncle. Turions are sometimes present.

References

External links
Jepson Manual Treatment
Photo gallery

foliosus
Flora of North America
Taxa named by Constantine Samuel Rafinesque